SQL Server may refer to:
 Microsoft SQL Server, a relational database server from Microsoft
 Sybase SQL Server, a relational database server developed by Sybase
 SQL Server Pro, a trade publication and web site owned by Penton Media